The Neighborhood is a 2017 Canadian drama film directed by Frank D'Angelo.

Cast
Franco Nero as Guglielmo
Danny Aiello as Joseph Donatello
Michael Paré as Johnny 3
Maureen McCormick as Rachelle
Margot Kidder as Maggie
Armand Assante as Tucci
Leslie Easterbrook as Annabella
Burt Young as Jingles
John Savage as Vito Bello
Giancarlo Giannini as Gianluca Moretti
Daniel Baldwin as Gianluca Moretti
John Ashton as Matt Krivinsky

References

External links

2017 drama films
Canadian drama films
English-language Canadian films
Films directed by Frank D'Angelo
2010s English-language films
2010s Canadian films